Events from the year 1860 in Germany.

Incumbents
 King of Bavaria – Maximilian II
 King of Hanover – George V
 King of Prussia – Frederick William IV
 King of Saxony – John
 King of Württemberg – William I of Württemberg
 Grand Duke of Baden – Frederick I

Events
 17 May – The sports club TSV 1860 Munich is founded in the Bavarian capital of Munich
 3 September – The Karlsruhe Congress of chemists begins

Undated
 Cologne Zoological Garden is opened.
 Erlenmeyer flask is created by Emil Erlenmeyer.

Births
 14 February – Eugen Schiffer, German politician (died 1954)
 25 March – Friedrich Naumann, German politician (died 1919) 
 4 May – Hans Georg Friedrich Groß, German balloonist and airship constructor (died 1924)
 20 May – Eduard Buchner, German chemist, winner of the 1907 Nobel Prize in Chemistry (died 1917)
 4 June – Friedrich Schmidt-Ott, German lawyer, scientific organizer, and science policymaker (died (1956)
 5 July – Albert Döderlein, German obstetrician and gynecologist (died 1941)
 24 July – Princess Charlotte of Prussia, Prussian princess (died 1919)
 25 July – Princess Louise Margaret of Prussia, Prussian princess (died 1917)
 13 September – Konstantin Schmidt von Knobelsdorf, German general (died 1936)
 28 October – Hugo Preuß, German lawyer and liberal politician (died 1925)
 24 November — Ulrike Henschke, German women's right activist and education reformer (died 1897)

Deaths 
 9 January – Karl Rudolf Brommy, German naval officer (born 1804)
 29 January – Ernst Moritz Arndt, historian, writer and poet (born 1769)
 14 May – Ludwig Bechstein, writer (born 1801)
 18 June – Friedrich Wilhelm von Bismarck, diplomat and military writer (born 1783)
 21 September – Arthur Schopenhauer, philosopher (born 1788)
 25 November – Duke Paul Wilhelm of Württemberg, nobleman, explorer and writer (born 1797)
 21 December – Peter Friedhofen, German Roman Catholic professed religious and the founder of the Brothers of Mercy of Mary Help of Christians (born 1819)

References 

 
Years of the 19th century in Germany
Germany
Germany